Archigrammitis friderici-et-pauli is a species of fern in the family Polypodiaceae, subfamily Grammitidoideae, according to the Pteridophyte Phylogeny Group classification of 2016 (PPG I). It is native to Borneo and Sulawesi.

Taxonomy
Konrad H. Christ first described this species in 1896, under the name Polypodium friderici-et-pauli. This is the basionym of Archigrammitis friderici-et-pauli, published by Barbara S. Parris in 2013. Christ caused some confusion over the use of the epithet friderici-et-pauli. The previous year, 1895, he had published the name Davallia friderici-et-pauli. This is the basionym of the accepted name Acrosorus friderici-et-pauli, published by Edwin Copeland in 1906. In 1904, Christ again published the name Polypodium friderici-et-pauli, this time making reference to Davallia. Hence Polypodium friderici-et-pauli Christ (1896) is a synonym of this species, whereas Polypodium friderici-et-pauli Christ (1904) is an illegitimate synonym of Acrosorus friderici-et-pauli.

References

Polypodiaceae
Flora of Borneo
Flora of Sulawesi
Plants described in 1896